Temasek Polytechnic (TP) is a post-secondary education institution and statutory board under the purview of the Ministry of Education in Singapore. 

Established in 1990, TP is renowned for its law, and design programmes. It is also the first and only polytechnic in Singapore to offer a law programme.

History

1989–1995
In June 1989, Minister for Education Tony Tan announced that a third polytechnic is being considered and in April 1990, Temasek Polytechnic was established with an initial enrolment of 735 students. The polytechnic originally set up at Baharuddin Vocational Institute's premises at Stirling Road and the vacated premises of Raffles Institution at Grange Road. Due to increased enrolment and the introduction of new courses, three more campuses at Kim Seng, Bukit Merah and Portsdown Road were acquired to house the polytechnic's student population.

1995: Moving to a permanent location
In September 1995, the permanent campus for Temasek Polytechnic was completed and it moved to its current location in the town of Tampines.

2012–present: Logo redesign, construction of foyer
Temasek Polytechnic underwent a logo redesign, sporting a fresh new look to reflect the vibrancy of the school. The TP Auditorium Foyer began construction in 2010 and was completed in 2013. McDonald's, Subway, and Cheers are available to both staff and the general public.

In 2022, Temasek Polytechnic changed its school motto to Creating Tomorrow.

Academic

Academic Schools
 School of Applied Science
 School of Business
 School of Design
 School of Engineering
 School of Humanities & Social Sciences
 School of Informatics & IT
 Temasek Tourism Academy (TTA)
 Temasek Aviation Academy (TAA)

Temasek Polytechnic offers 37 full-time diploma courses in the areas of applied sciences, business, design, engineering, humanities & social sciences, and informatics & IT.

Polytechnic Foundation Programme
The Polytechnic Foundation Programme (PFP) was introduced in 2011 for students in the Normal (Academic) stream to be offered an opportunity to gain direct entry into Polytechnic diploma programmes with their 'N' Level certifications starting from 2012 onwards. Top students of the cohort each year would be offered the programme to skip their 'O' Level studies and instead enrol into a polytechnic of their choice to complete a foundation year before embarking on their respective diploma programmes. During the foundation year, students would take introductory modules that would expose them to their courses of studies so that they would cope better in their first year. There is no GPA requirement to advance to Year 1, as long as students pass all of their modules during Year 0. Although they would also be graded in Year 0, the GPA will not count towards their cumulative GPA when Year 1 commences.

The Centre for Foundation Studies (CFS) in Temasek Polytechnic was established in 2011 for students admitted into their PFP studies (Year 0).

Courses offered

Campus features

Temasek Polytechnic's campus was designed by architect James Stirling. The campus has 61 lecture theatres, a convention centre, canteens, auditoria, an amphitheatre, laboratories and training facilities, a large library, sporting facilities, and 13 food outlets including three cafés, three F&B outlets and an air-conditioned food court.

The Temasek Aviation Academy was opened in 2014 in the School of Engineering . In 2016, a 6,000 square metre facility housing specialised laboratories, and specialised training equipment for related aerospace diploma courses.

Achievements
 In 2018, students designed and built a Proton Exchange Membrane-power unit, successfully powering both an UAV and an electric bicycle using the same unit, thought to be a world-first.
 The School of Design is a Five-time winner of the Crowbar Awards 'Institution of the Year' for the year 2017, 2018, 2019, 2020 and 2021. The Crowbar Awards is the only major student competition in the region and sees entries from institutions worldwide.
 A team of students from the school of Engineering, Diploma in Aerospace Engineering (AEG) course won the Gold award in the annual Singapore Space Challenge (SSC2018) competition held on 2 February 2018 by the Singapore Space and Technology Association.

Notable alumni

Entertainment
 Dasmond Koh, former Mediacorp actor, television host and radio DJ 
 Priscelia Chan, Mediacorp actress
 Xu Bin, Mediacorp actor
 Hong Ling, Mediacorp actress
 Ferlyn Wong, singer
 Sylvia Ratonel, singer and Singapore Idol finalist
 Hady Mirza, singer, and Singapore Idol and Asian Idol winner

Politics
 Teo Ser Luck, Mayor of North East District (2009–2017), Minister of State for Trade and Industry (2011–2015) and Minister of State for Manpower (2015–2017)
 Wan Rizal, Member of Parliament for Jalan Besar GRC (2020–present)
 Hany Soh, Member of Parliament for Marsiling–Yew Tee GRC (2020–present)

Sports
 Charmaine Soh, netball player and captain of the Singapore national team
 Faris Ramli, Singapore national team footballer
 Marc Ryan Tan, footballer
 Jacob Mahler, footballer

References

External links
 Temasek Polytechnic homepage
 Temasek Polytechnic blog

 
Polytechnics in Singapore
Statutory boards of the Singapore Government
1990 establishments in Singapore
Educational institutions established in 1990
Education in Singapore
Tampines